Melling may refer to:

Places
 Melling, Merseyside, an area of Sefton, Merseyside, England
 Melling, Lancashire, a village near Carnforth, Lancashire, England
 Melling, New Zealand, a suburb of Lower Hutt, New Zealand
 Melling Branch, a railway branch line
 Melling railway station

Motorsport
 Melling Racing, a NASCAR team that ran from 1982 to 2003

Other uses
 Melling (surname)
 Melling, name of a GWR Hawthorn Class 2-4-0 locomotive
 Melling School, a book series by Margaret Biggs, published in the 1950s and 1960s

See also
Meling